Santa Marta de Tormes (Saint Martha upon Tormes) is a municipality in the province of Salamanca,  western Spain, part of the autonomous community of Castile and León, on the outskirts of the capital Salamanca, located only 3 kilometers away. In 2018, it had a population of 14,732.

Culture
San Blas Festival 3 February
Santa Marta Festival 29 July

See also
List of municipalities in Salamanca

References

Municipalities in the Province of Salamanca